The Christchurch Gondola is a tourist attraction service offered by Christchurch Attractions in Christchurch, New Zealand. The gondola base is located in Heathcote Valley, and it traverses the slopes of Mount Cavendish in the Port Hills. Sometimes used as a transport method for visitors who use the walking tracks on Mt Cavendish, the gondola is ranked as one of the top tourist attractions in Christchurch by TripAdvisor.

The gondola opened as the Mount Cavendish Gondola in October 1992 after a long planning process at a costs of $NZ11.5 million. The land around the gondola was landscaped with 16,000 native tussock after the completion of construction. The gondola includes 19 cabins and has a capacity of 812 travellers per hour.

2011 Christchurch earthquake 
The gondola closed following the 2011 Christchurch earthquake, and was reopened in March 2013 by NZ Prime Minister John Key.

2016 breakdown 
In February 2016, the gondola broke down with passengers trapped in the cabins for two hours without communication from the operator. The managing director's comment that the incident was "no big deal" caused upset by those affected. Within days, the company vowed to install a speaker system into the cabins at a cost of up to NZ$50,000 so that communication to stuck passengers became possible.

Operator 
The Christchurch Gondola is operated by Christchurch Attractions, who also currently operate the Christchurch Tram system.

References

Tourist attractions in Christchurch
Transport in Christchurch
Gondola lifts in New Zealand
1992 establishments in New Zealand